Sytske de Groot (born 3 April 1986 in Delft) is a Dutch rower. She competed at the 2012 Summer Olympics where she won the bronze medal in the Women's eight.

As of 2012, she was a student of marine engineering at Delft University of Technology and she was a member of the DSR Proteus-Eretes student rowing club in Delft. As a part of Dutch women's eight team, she was a bronze medalist at the 2009 European Championship and a silver medalist of the 2010 European Championship.

References

Notes

Sources
 

1986 births
Living people
Dutch female rowers
Rowers at the 2012 Summer Olympics
Olympic rowers of the Netherlands
Olympic bronze medalists for the Netherlands
Olympic medalists in rowing
Sportspeople from Delft
Medalists at the 2012 Summer Olympics
World Rowing Championships medalists for the Netherlands
21st-century Dutch women
20th-century Dutch women